Paul Cockburn is a game designer who has worked primarily on role-playing games.

Career
Paul Cockburn worked for TSR's Imagine magazine. Cockburn later led the new editorial team of White Dwarf as its editor, beginning in 1986 with issue #78.

References

External links
 

Dungeons & Dragons game designers
Living people
Place of birth missing (living people)
Year of birth missing (living people)